A headshunt (or escape track in the United States) is a short length of track provided to release locomotives at terminal platforms, or to allow shunting to take place clear of main lines.

Terminal headshunt

A 'terminal headshunt' is a short length of track that allows a locomotive to uncouple from its train, move forward, and then run back past it on a parallel track. Such headshunts are typically installed at a terminal station to allow the locomotive of an arriving train to move to the opposite end of (in railway parlance, 'run around') its train so that it can then haul the same train out of the station in the other direction (assuming, of course, that it is a locomotive equipped to run in either direction; for locomotives that only operate in one direction, a wye or turntable needs to be provided to physically turn the engine around, as well as a run-around track).

Reversing headshunt

Found primarily on metro systems, rapid transit light rail networks, and tramways, a 'reversing headshunt' allows certain trains or trams to change direction, even on lines with high traffic flow, whilst others continue through the station. Typically there will be two running lines, one for each direction of travel, and the headshunt will be positioned between the two running lines, linked to both by points. Although most trains will pass through the station and continue in the same direction, an individual train may be directed into the reversing headshunt, before exiting onto the other running line, in the opposite direction of travel. This procedure allows a greater frequency of trains on a city-centre section of the line, and reduced frequency on the suburban sections, by allowing certain trains to shuttle back and forth only on the city centre part, using the reversing headshunts to change direction within the flow of trains.

Shunting neck

The term headshunt may also refer to shunting neck or 'shunt spur': a short length of track laid parallel to the main line to allow a train to shunt back into a siding or rail yard without occupying the main running-line.

Run round

A run round loop (or run-around loop) is a track arrangement that enables a locomotive to attach to the opposite end of the train. It is commonly used to haul wagons onto a siding, or at a terminal station to prepare for a return journey. This process is known as "running round a train".

Although a common procedure for passenger trains when the majority of them were locomotive-hauled, the maneuver is now becoming rarer on public service railways. Increased use of multiple unit and push-pull passenger services avoids the requirement for dedicated track and the need for railway staff to detach and reattach the locomotive at track level. However, on heritage railways run-round loops are still usually more or less necessary at each end of the running line, partly because train services are usually locomotive-hauled, and partly because the run-round operation gives added interest to visitors. This practice is still very common on Intercity services in Victoria, Australia.

Runaround tracks are used in freight rail service in order to back cars into spurs or to change directions to keep the locomotive at the front of the train for transport.  In this case the runaround track must be as long as the longest set of cars that would be pulled.  The locomotive leaves the cars on the runaround track or the main line, goes around, and hooks up to the other end of the train.  It can then reverse the cars into a spur.

Examples 
Stations which used to have run-rounds include:
 UK
 Edinburgh Waverley railway station; The terminal platforms of this station featured locomotive release roads between two main platforms, connected by a three-way point to the crossover from each platform line.  The same arrangement of a three-way point on a central release road was also installed at the now closed stations :
 Manchester Central.
 Liverpool Exchange.
 Leeds Central.
 St Ives railway station
 Matlock Riverside railway station, now closed
 Birmingham Moor Street.  This station is on a confined site, so to save space the platform lines were equipped with traversers to allow locomotives to run round via the adjacent platform line (platforms 1 & 2) or an adjacent loop (platform 3).
 Withernsea, the terminal station on the now closed Hull and Holderness Railway.  At this station, instead of a crossover or points the run round loop was accessed from a turntable at the end of the platform line and run round loop.  There was a similar arrangement at Ventnor and Bembridge railway stations on the Isle of Wight.  

 Australia
 Murwillumbah railway station, now closed
 Toronto railway station, New South Wales, now closed
 Cronulla railway station, had run-round, but never had locomotives
 Newcastle railway station, New South Wales, now closed; run-round on Platform 1&2, not on Platform 3&4

Stations which still have run-rounds include:
 UK
 Weymouth railway station
 Fort William railway station
 Morecambe railway station
 Rowsley South railway station
 Mallaig railway station
 Germany
 Hagen Hauptbahnhof
 Australia (all in regular loco-hauled passenger use unless otherwise indicated) 
 Central railway station, Sydney
 Albury railway station
 Canberra railway station (run-around not in regular use)
 Southern Cross railway station (Melbourne)
 Shepparton railway station
 Bairnsdale railway station
 Geelong railway station
 South Geelong railway station
 Marshall railway station
 Warrnambool railway station
 Swan Hill railway station
 Seymour railway station
 Roma Street railway station (Brisbane) (not sure if run-around in use)
 Toowoomba railway station
 Charleville railway station
 Rockhampton railway station
 Longreach railway station
 Townsville railway station
 Mount Isa railway station
 Cairns railway station
 Kuranda railway station
 Adelaide Parklands Terminal
 Public Transport Centre (East Perth terminal)
 Darwin railway station

No loop 
If a terminal station does not have a run-round loop trains are restricted to multiple units or Top and Tail trains.

See also
Backshunt

References 

Railway sidings